Octomeria gehrtii is a species of orchid endemic to Brazil (São Paulo to Paraná).

References 

gehrtii
Endemic orchids of Brazil
Orchids of São Paulo (state)
Orchids of Paraná (state)